The Territorial Prelature of Santo Cristo de Esquípulas is a Roman Catholic territorial prelature located in the city of Esquipulas, Chiquimula in Guatemala.

History
 September 16, 1956: Established as Territorial Prelature of Santo Cristo de Esquípulas from the Roman Catholic Diocese of Zacapa

Special churches
Minor Basilicas:
 Basílica del Cristo Negro de Esquipulas, Esquipulas, Chiquimula

Leadership
 Prelates of Santo Cristo de Esquípulas (Roman rite)
 Archbishop Mariano Rossell y Arellano (1956)
 Bishop Costantino Cristiano Luna Pianegonda, O.F.M. (September 16, 1956 – February 16, 1980)
 Bishop Rodolfo Quezada Toruño (later Cardinal) (June 24, 1986 – June 19, 2001)
 Bishop José Aníbal Casasola Sosa (May 13, 2004 – April 27, 2007)
 Bishop Rosolino Bianchetti Boffelli (November 20, 2008 – present)

References
 GCatholic.org
 Prelature website (Spanish)

Roman Catholic dioceses in Guatemala
Christian organizations established in 1956
Roman Catholic dioceses and prelatures established in the 20th century
Territorial prelatures